Englewood Cliffs College was a women's college for Roman Catholic nuns and laypersons in Englewood Cliffs, New Jersey. It was founded in 1962 by the Sisters of Saint Joseph of Newark originally as a sisters' college. It closed in 1974 because of financial problems.

In 1975, the college campus became part of St. Peter's College (now St. Peter's University), a Jesuit higher education institution in nearby Jersey City.

The school was founded in June 1962 as Archangel College, a junior formation college for Roman Catholic nuns. It was built on the site of the former Palisades Mountain House. Lay female students were first admitted in 1966 and the school's name was changed to Englewood Cliffs College. It became coeducational in 1969. In 1972, faculty members volunteered as instructors in New Jersey correctional institutions.

The college's founding president was Sister Madeleine Crotty, CSJ. She was succeeded by Sister Redempta McConnell, who became acting president upon Sister Madeleine's resignation due to failing health. Sister Redempta previously served as president of San Isidro College, a high school in the Philippines, from 1953 to 1965.

On January 19, 1974, the basketball team was defeated by Essex County College by a score of 210–67, a collegiate record losing margin of 143 points.

References

Sources
List of closed New Jersey colleges, universities, and schools

Defunct private universities and colleges in New Jersey
Defunct Catholic universities and colleges in the United States
Universities and colleges in Bergen County, New Jersey
Former women's universities and colleges in the United States
Educational institutions established in 1962
Educational institutions disestablished in 1974
Catholic universities and colleges in New Jersey
1962 establishments in New Jersey
Sisters' colleges
History of women in New Jersey